In optics and photography, hyperfocal distance is a distance beyond which all objects can be brought into an "acceptable" focus. As the hyperfocal distance is the focus distance giving the maximum depth of field, it is the most desirable distance to set the focus of a fixed-focus camera. The hyperfocal distance is entirely dependent upon what level of sharpness is considered to be acceptable.

The hyperfocal distance has a property called "consecutive depths of field", where a lens focused at an object whose distance is at the hyperfocal distance H will hold a depth of field from H/2 to infinity, if the lens is focused to H/2, the depth of field will extend from H/3 to H; if the lens is then focused to H/3, the depth of field will extend from H/4 to H/2, etc.

Thomas Sutton and George Dawson first wrote about hyperfocal distance (or "focal range") in 1867. Louis Derr in 1906 may have been the first to derive a formula for hyperfocal distance. Rudolf Kingslake wrote in 1951 about the two methods of measuring hyperfocal distance.

Some cameras have their hyperfocal distance marked on the focus dial. For example, on the Minox LX focusing dial there is a red dot between 2 m and infinity; when the lens is set at the red dot, that is, focused at the hyperfocal distance, the depth of field stretches from 2 m to infinity.  Some lenses have markings indicating the hyperfocal range for specific f-stops.

Two methods 
There are two common methods of defining and measuring hyperfocal distance, leading to values that differ only slightly. The distinction between the two meanings is rarely made, since they have almost identical values. The value computed according to the first definition exceeds that from the second by just one focal length.

Definition 1: The hyperfocal distance is the closest distance at which a lens can be focused while keeping objects at infinity acceptably sharp. When the lens is focused at this distance, all objects at distances from half of the hyperfocal distance out to infinity will be acceptably sharp.

Definition 2: The hyperfocal distance is the distance beyond which all objects are acceptably sharp, for a lens focused at infinity.

Acceptable sharpness

The hyperfocal distance is entirely dependent upon what level of sharpness is considered to be acceptable. The criterion for the desired acceptable sharpness is specified through the circle of confusion (CoC) diameter limit. This criterion is the largest acceptable spot size diameter that an infinitesimal point is allowed to spread out to on the imaging medium (film, digital sensor, etc.).

Formulae

For the first definition,

where

 is hyperfocal distance

 is focal length

 is f-number ( for aperture diameter )

 is the circle of confusion limit

For any practical f-number, the added focal length is insignificant in comparison
with the first term, so that

This formula is exact for the second definition, if  is measured from a thin lens, or from the front principal plane of a complex lens; it is also exact for the first definition if  is measured from a point that is one focal length in front of the front principal plane.  For practical purposes, there is little difference between the first and second definitions.

Derivation using geometric optics

The following derivations refer to the accompanying figures. For clarity, half the aperture and circle of confusion are indicated.

Definition 1

An object at distance H forms a sharp image at distance x  (blue line). Here, objects at infinity have images with a circle of confusion indicated by the brown ellipse where the upper red ray through the focal point intersects the blue line.

First using similar triangles hatched in green,

Then using similar triangles dotted in purple,

as found above.

Definition 2

Objects at infinity form sharp images at the focal length f  (blue line). Here, an object at H forms an image with a circle of confusion indicated by the brown ellipse where the lower red ray converging to its sharp image intersects the blue line.

Using similar triangles shaded in yellow,

Example

As an example, for a 50 mm lens at  using a circle of confusion of 0.03 mm, which is a value typically used in 35 mm photography, the hyperfocal distance according to Definition 1 is

If the lens is focused at a distance of 10.5 m, then everything from half that distance (5.2 m) to infinity will be acceptably sharp in our photograph. With the formula for the Definition 2, the result is 10417 mm, a difference of 0.5%.

Consecutive depths of field 
The hyperfocal distance has a curious property: while a lens focused at H will hold a depth of field from H/2 to infinity, if the lens is focused to H/2, the depth of field will extend from H/3 to H; if the lens is then focused to H/3, the depth of field will extend from H/4 to H/2.  This continues on through all successive 1/x values of the hyperfocal distance. That is, focusing at H/n will cause the depth of field to extend from H/(n+1) to H/(n-1).

Piper (1901) calls this phenomenon "consecutive depths of field" and shows how to test the idea easily.  This is also among the earliest of publications to use the word hyperfocal.

History

The concepts of the two definitions of hyperfocal distance have a long history, tied up with the terminology for depth of field, depth of focus, circle of confusion, etc.  Here are some selected early quotations and interpretations on the topic.

Sutton and Dawson 1867

Thomas Sutton and George Dawson define focal range for what we now call hyperfocal distance:

Their focal range is about 1000 times their aperture diameter, so it makes sense as a hyperfocal distance with CoC value of f/1000, or image format diagonal times 1/1000 assuming the lens is a “normal” lens.  What is not clear, however, is whether the focal range they cite was computed, or empirical.

Abney 1881

Sir William de Wivelesley Abney says:

That is, a is the reciprocal of what we now call the f-number, and the answer is evidently in meters.  His 0.41 should obviously be 0.40.  Based on his formulae, and on the notion that the aperture ratio should be kept fixed in comparisons across formats, Abney says:

Taylor 1892

John Traill Taylor recalls this word formula for a sort of hyperfocal distance:

This formula implies a stricter CoC criterion than we typically use today.

Hodges 1895

John Hodges discusses depth of field without formulas but with some of these relationships:

This "mathematically" observed relationship implies that he had a formula at hand, and a parameterization with the f-number or “intensity ratio” in it.  To get an inverse-square relation to focal length, you have to assume that the CoC limit is fixed and the aperture diameter scales with the focal length, giving a constant f-number.

Piper 1901

C. Welborne Piper may be the first to have published a clear distinction between Depth of Field in the modern sense and Depth of Definition in the focal plane, and implies that Depth of Focus and Depth of Distance are sometimes used for the former (in modern usage, Depth of Focus is usually reserved for the latter).  He uses the term Depth Constant for H, and measures it from the front principal focus (i. e., he counts one focal length less than the distance from the lens to get the simpler formula), and even introduces the modern term:

It is unclear what distinction he means.  Adjacent to Table I in his appendix, he further notes:

At this point we do not have evidence of the term hyperfocal before Piper, nor the hyphenated hyper-focal which he also used, but he obviously did not claim to coin this descriptor himself.

Derr 1906

Louis Derr may be the first to clearly specify the first definition, which is considered to be the strictly correct one in modern times, and to derive the formula corresponding to it.

 

As the aperture diameter,  is the ratio of the focal length,  to the numerical aperture, ; and the diameter of the circle of confusion, this gives the equation for the first definition above.

Johnson 1909

George Lindsay Johnson uses the term Depth of Field for what Abney called Depth of Focus, and Depth of Focus in the modern sense (possibly for the first time), as the allowable distance error in the focal plane.  His definitions include hyperfocal distance:

His drawing makes it clear that his e is the radius of the circle of confusion.  He has clearly anticipated the need to tie it to format size or enlargement, but has not given a general scheme for choosing it.

Johnson's use of former and latter seem to be swapped; perhaps former was here meant to refer to the immediately preceding section title Depth of Focus, and latter to the current section title Depth of Field.  Except for an obvious factor-of-2 error in using the ratio of stop diameter to CoC radius, this definition is the same as Abney's hyperfocal distance.

Others, early twentieth century

The term hyperfocal distance also appears in Cassell's Cyclopaedia of 1911, The Sinclair Handbook of Photography of 1913, and Bayley's The Complete Photographer of 1914.

Kingslake 1951

Rudolf Kingslake is explicit about the two meanings:

Kingslake uses the simplest formulae for DOF near and far distances, which has the effect of making the two different definitions of hyperfocal distance give identical values.

See also
 Circle of confusion
 Deep focus
 Depssi, depth of field sunrise/sunset indicator

References

External links
 http://www.dofmaster.com/dofjs.html to calculate hyperfocal distance and depth of field

Length
Science of photography